The Lo Nuestro Award for Artist of the Year  is an honor presented annually by American network Univision. The Lo Nuestro Awards were first awarded since 1989 and was established to recognize the most talented performers of Latin music. The nominees and winners were originally selected by a voting poll conducted among program directors of Spanish-language radio stations in the United States and also based on chart performance on Billboard Latin music charts, with the results being tabulated and certified by the accounting firm Deloitte. At the present time, the winners are selected by the audience through an online survey. The trophy awarded is shaped in the form of a treble clef.

In 2010, the Artist of the Year award was presented for the first time and the nominees included bands Aventura and Maná and performers Flex, Luis Fonsi and Vicente Fernández. Aventura earned the award, and also was the recipient of the first Latin Artist of the Year accolade at the Billboard Latin Music Awards, which combines achievements on both the Top Latin Albums and Hot Latin Songs charts. The following year, reggaeton duo Wisin & Yandel won the category, and also received the Lo Nuestro Award for Urban Album and Song of the Year.

Colombian singer-songwriter Shakira was recognized as Person of the Year by the Latin Academy of Recording Arts & Sciences in November 2011; three months later was awarded the Lo Nuestro Award for Artist of the Year. In 2012, Shakira also received the American Music Award for Favorite Latin Artist. American banda performer Jenni Rivera won the accolade posthumously, and at the 2013 ceremony received a tribute by various artists, including actor Edward James Olmos and singers Thalía, Paulina Rubio, and Gerardo Ortíz, among others. Mexican band Maná is the most nominated act without a win, with four unsuccessful nominations.

Winners and nominees
Listed below are the winners of the award for each year, as well as the other nominees.

See also
Los Premios MTV Latinoamérica for Artist of the Year

References

Artist of the Year
Awards established in 2010